Diporiphora reginae, the plain-backed two-line dragon, is a species of agama found in Australia.

References

Diporiphora
Agamid lizards of Australia
Taxa named by Ludwig Glauert
Reptiles described in 1959